Mandara is a German television series.

See also
List of German television series

External links
 

1983 German television series debuts
1983 German television series endings
German children's television series
German-language television shows
ZDF original programming